Windows 10 April 2018 Update (also known as version 1803 and codenamed "Redstone 4") is the fifth major update to Windows 10 and the fourth in a series of updates under the Redstone codenames. It carries the build number 10.0.17134.

Version history
The first preview was released to Insiders on August 31, 2017. The final release was made available to Windows Insiders on April 16, 2018, followed by a public release on April 30, and began to roll out on May 8.

The update would have originally reached end of service on November 10, 2020 for Education and Enterprise editions, but this was postponed to May 11 of the following year due to the COVID-19 pandemic, after the release of build 17134.2208.

See also
Windows 10 version history

References

Windows 10
History of Microsoft
Software version histories